The HL7 Clinical Document Architecture (CDA) is an XML-based markup standard intended to specify the encoding, structure and semantics of clinical documents for exchange. In November 2000, HL7 published Release 1.0. The organization published Release 2.0 with its "2005 Normative Edition."

Content
CDA specifies the syntax and supplies a framework for specifying the full semantics of a clinical document, defined by six characteristics:
 Persistence
 Stewardship
 Potential for authentication
 Context
 Wholeness
 Human readability

CDA can hold any kind of clinical information that would be included in a patient's medical record; examples include:
 Discharge summary (following inpatient care)
 History & physical
 Specialist reports, such as those for medical imaging or pathology

An XML element in a CDA supports unstructured text, as well as links to composite documents encoded in pdf, docx, or rtf, as well as image formats like jpg and png.

It was developed using the HL7 Development Framework (HDF) and it is based on the HL7 Reference Information Model (RIM) and the HL7 Version 3 Data Types.

The CDA specifies that the content of the document consists of a mandatory textual part (which ensures human interpretation of the document contents) and optional structured parts (for software processing). The structured part relies on coding systems (such as from SNOMED and LOINC) to represent concepts.

Consolidated Clinical Document Architecture
In 2012, in response to conflicting CDAs in use by the healthcare industry, the Office of the National Coordinator for Health Information Technology (ONC) streamlined commonly used templates to create the Consolidated-CDA (C-CDA).

Transport

The CDA standard doesn't specify how the documents should be transported. CDA documents can be transported using HL7 version 2 messages, HL7 version 3 messages, IHE protocols such as XDS, as well as by other mechanisms including: DICOM, MIME attachments to email, http or ftp.

Standard certification and adoption
The standard is certified by ANSI.

CDA Release 2 has been adopted as an ISO standard, ISO/HL7 27932:2009.

Country-specific implementations

Australia
Australia's Personally Controlled Electronic Health Record (PCEHR), known as "My Health Record," uses a specialized implementation of HL7 CDA Release 2.

United Kingdom
In the UK the Interoperability Toolkit (ITK) utilises the 'CDA R2 from HL7 V3 - for CDA profiles' for the Correspondence pack.

United States
In the U.S. the CDA standard is probably best known as the basis for the Continuity of Care Document (CCD) specification, based on the data model as specified by ASTM's Continuity of Care Record. The U.S. Healthcare Information Technology Standards Panel has selected the CCD as one of its standards.

See also
 EHRcom
 Health Informatics Service Architecture (HISA)
 Gello Expression Language
 Fast Healthcare Interoperability Resources

References

Further reading

External links
 
 
 
 

Standards for electronic health records
Computer file formats
Industry-specific XML-based standards